Fred Kennedy may refer to:
Fred Kennedy (footballer), English footballer
Frederick Charles Kennedy, Scottish river-boat fleet owner
Fred Kennedy (engineer), American Air force officer